Phyllonorycter idolias is a moth of the family Gracillariidae. It is known from Algeria.

The food plant is unknown, but a specimens were beaten from Quercus species.

References

idolias
Endemic fauna of Algeria
Moths described in 1891
Moths of Africa